The 1975–76 Boston Bruins season was the Bruins' 52nd season in the NHL. The season involved trading Phil Esposito to the New York Rangers, while a knee injury limited Bobby Orr to 10 games.

Offseason

NHL Draft

Regular season

Season standings

Schedule and results

Player statistics

Regular season
Scoring

Goaltending

Playoffs
Scoring

Goaltending

Playoffs

Awards and honors
 Jack Adams Award: || Don Cherry
 Lady Byng Memorial Trophy: || Jean Ratelle
 Brad Park, Defenceman, NHL First Team All-Star

References
 Bruins on Hockey Database

Boston Bruins seasons
Boston Bruins
Boston Bruins
Adams Division champion seasons
Boston Bruins
Boston Bruins
Bruins
Bruins